Sergey Valentinovich Shilov (born October 1, 1970) is a Russian cross-country skier, biathlete, and six-time Paralympic Champion.

Shilov has competed at nine Paralympic Games (five Winter and four Summer), in cross-country skiing, biathlon, and athletics. He has won a total of 10 medals at the Games, in cross-country skiing, of which six are gold.

References

External links 
 
 
 

1970 births
Living people
Russian male biathletes
Russian male cross-country skiers
Paralympic athletes of Russia
Paralympic biathletes of Russia
Paralympic cross-country skiers of Russia
Paralympic gold medalists for Russia
Paralympic silver medalists for Russia
Paralympic bronze medalists for Russia
Paralympic medalists in cross-country skiing
Athletes (track and field) at the 1992 Summer Paralympics
Athletes (track and field) at the 2000 Summer Paralympics
Athletes (track and field) at the 2004 Summer Paralympics
Athletes (track and field) at the 2008 Summer Paralympics
Biathletes at the 1994 Winter Paralympics
Biathletes at the 2002 Winter Paralympics
Biathletes at the 2006 Winter Paralympics
Biathletes at the 2010 Winter Paralympics
Cross-country skiers at the 1994 Winter Paralympics
Cross-country skiers at the 1998 Winter Paralympics
Cross-country skiers at the 2002 Winter Paralympics
Cross-country skiers at the 2006 Winter Paralympics
Cross-country skiers at the 2010 Winter Paralympics
Medalists at the 1998 Winter Paralympics
Medalists at the 2002 Winter Paralympics
Medalists at the 2006 Winter Paralympics
Medalists at the 2010 Winter Paralympics
Sportspeople from Pskov